The Rio Grande Southern Railroad Derrick Car is a railroad derrick car which was produced in 1948 for the Rio Grande Southern Railroad.  It is one of only three W60 Series A Derrick Cars narrow-gauge examples ever built by the Fairmont Railway Motors Inc., and it is the only one still extant. It is located at the Cimarron Visitor Center of the Curecanti National Recreation Area, in Cimarron, Colorado.  It was listed on the National Register of Historic Places in 2010.

References

National Register of Historic Places in Colorado
Buildings and structures completed in 1948
Montrose County, Colorado
Mobile cranes
Curecanti National Recreation Area
Derrick Car
Individual cranes (machines)